The Seventeenth Century (originally titled Let the Snakes Crinkle Their Heads to Death) is the fifth album by English alternative rock band Felt, released in 1986.

Their first album for Creation Records, it is composed of short instrumentals in different styles and is less than nineteen minutes in length. The original album cover featured a photo of the band which was replaced on reissues by a cropped version.

For the 2018 reissue of the album, Felt singer, guitarist and songwriter Lawrence returned the record to its original planned title, renaming it The Seventeenth Century. The CD reissue also featured a different cover, replacing previously used photographs with typography.

Track listing
All songs written by Lawrence.

Personnel
Lawrence – guitar
Martin Duffy – Hammond organ, electric piano
Marco Thomas – bass
Gary Ainge – drums, bongos

References

Felt (band) albums
1986 albums
Creation Records albums